Velp is a village in the Dutch province of North Brabant. It is located in the former municipality of Grave, about 2 km southwest of the city.

History 
Velp is a village with two centres. The oldest centre developed on the river bank of the Maas in the Early Middle Ages. A second centre appeared around the seminary Mariëndaal. The land van Ravenstein was conquered by France in 1794, and sold to the Batavian Republic (the predecessor of the Kingdom of the Netherlands) in 1800.

The St Vincentius Church dates from the 12th century. The tower was built in the 14th century. In 1674, it was restored after a fire. In 1960, it was restored and the modifications from 1765 were undone.

The Capuchin monastery Emmaüs was founded in 1645 by the priest of Grave who had moved to the Land van Ravenstein. It was damaged by floods in the winter of 1715/1716. The monastery was replaced in 1718, and the chapel in 1733.

The former seminary Mariëndaal was built between 1862 and 1865 in neoclassic style with elements of early Gothic Revival. It is currently used a psychiatric hospital.

The Generaal de Bons barracks were built by the city of Grave to defend against the French in 1794. There was no room to built it in Grave, and therefore, it was built over the border in Velp. In 1939, it was renovated and captured by the German army the next year. The Germans used it as barracks until September 1944, and it was later used by the Dutch army. In 1994, it was decided to close the barracks and the last soldiers left in 1997. Until 2019, it was used for asylum seekers.

Velp was home to 614 people in 1840. Velp was a separate municipality until 1942, when it became part of Grave. Since 2022 it has been part of the new municipality of Land van Cuijk.

Gallery

References

External links

Populated places in North Brabant
Former municipalities of North Brabant
Geography of Land van Cuijk